Robert Conville (1881 - 1950) was an American silent film and theatrical actor. He appeared in several films with Marguerite Clark. He also appeared in several films that are not listed in sources. He was born in Maine and died in Los Angeles, California, in 1950.

Selected filmography
Still Waters (1915)
Mice and Men (1916)
Out of the Drifts (1916)
Nanette of the Wilds (1916)
Laughing Bill Hyde (1918)
The Sin That Was His (1920)
Out of the Clouds (1921)
 The Blonde Vampire (1922)
South Sea Love (1923)

References

External links

1881 births
1950 deaths
Actors from Maine
American male silent film actors
20th-century American male actors